Samuthiram is a 2001 Indian Tamil-language drama film written by Erode Soundar and directed by K. S. Ravikumar. The film stars an ensemble cast of Sarath Kumar, Murali, Manoj Bharathiraja, Kaveri, Abhirami, Sindhu Menon and Monal. The film's score and soundtrack are composed by Sabesh–Murali. The film was released on 31 August 2001. The film was remade in Telugu as Siva Rama Raju with Jagapathi Babu, in Bengali as Kartabya and in Kannada as Paramashiva with V. Ravichandran. Even though it got mixed reviews, it became a "superhit" at the box office.

Plot
Selvarasu is the head of his family, and his two brothers Thangarasu and Chinnarasu are ready to give up their lives for him. The three brothers are very fond of their sister Rasamani. A rich man from the neighboring village Chinniyampalyam Zamin Rangarajan, feels insulted when Thangarasu mishandles his son Aakash during a temple festival, and to take revenge, he comes with a wedding proposal to make Rasamani his daughter-in-law. At the time of the wedding, the groom's family demands the entire wealth of Selvarasu to be transferred to Rasamani as the dowry, for which Selvarasu and his brothers agree. The brothers are insulted at every opportunity, while Rasamani is also ill-treated by her husband and father in law.

Selvarasu is married to Lakshmi, while Thangarasu is married to his cousin Durga and Chinnarasu is in love with his classmate Priya. Rasamani conceives but still undergoes the torture of her family. Chinnarasu's wedding is arranged with Priya, and the brothers eagerly await for the arrival of Rasamani for the wedding. However, Rasamani is locked up in a room by Aakash, who is not permitting her to attend the wedding. Aakash also injures her feet while she tries to escape from her house with plans of attending the wedding. The brothers come to Rasamani's home requesting her to come for the wedding and are shocked to know that she is hurt and locked in a room. The brothers fight Aakash's goons. Rasamani gets furious and decides to end her relationship with Aakash. She removes the thaali and throws on the face of her husband and decides to go with her brothers. Thereafter, they got back their assets and she lived happily with her brothers.

Cast

 Sarath Kumar as Selvarasu
 Murali as Thangarasu, Selvarasu's brother
 Manoj Bharathiraja as Chinnarasu, Selvarasu's brother
 Kaveri as Rasamani, the sister of the brothers
 Abhirami as Lakshmi, Selvarasu's wife
 Sindhu Menon as Durga, Thangarasu's wife and cousin
 Monal as Priya, Chinnarasu's love interest
 Goundamani as Ramanathan, Selvarasu's maternal uncle
 Manivannan as Sundaram
 Senthil as M. Tharmaraj, Sundaram's nephew
 Akash as Aakash, Rasamani's husband
 Pyramid Natarajan as Chinnapalayam Zamin Rangarajan, Rasamani's father-in-law
 Priyanka as Bride Girl
 Manjula Vijayakumar as Parvathi, Durga's mother
 Thyagu as Priya's father
 Riyaz Khan as Priya's brother
 Santhana Bharathi as Rajalingam Gounder, Lakshmi's father
 Pandu as College Principal
 Manobala as Professor
 Vasu Vikram as Maruthamuthu 
 Lavanya
 Crane Manohar
 Erode Soundar as Mercenary Hitman
 Raadhika  (cameo appearance)
 K. S. Ravikumar (guest appearance in song "Vidiya Vidiya")
 Sridhar as dancer

Production
R. B. Choudary's financial problems meant that the director K. S. Ravikumar financed the first schedule of the film by himself. The producer acknowledged and thanked the director at the audio launch function.

In June 2001, during the shoot of the film in the Mandya district of Karnataka, the team were attacked by angry villagers. The set was trashed and crew members were injured.

Soundtrack

Sabesh–Murali, brothers of music composer Deva, made their debut as full-fledged composers with this project after composing background music for their brother's films previously. ) Song - Singers - Lyricist:
"Kaa Vitta" – Mano, Anuradha Sriram - Pa Vijay
"Kandupidi" – Hariharan, Ganga - Ilaiyakamban
"Azhagana Chinna Devathai" – Shankar Mahadevan, Harini - Kalaikumar
"Vidiya Vidiya" – Udit Narayan, Sadhana Sargam - Viveka
"Pineaple Vannathodu" – Shankar Mahadevan - Pa Vijay

Release
Samudhiram released on 31 August 2001.

Critical reception
The movie generally got mixed reviews as it was felt that the story is not new. Malathi Rangarajan from thehindu.com stated Samudhiram is a story of the sincere affection that exists in a family – love that is more filial than fraternal; attachment that is more unnatural than normal. Screenindia wrote that stars performed well in the film.

References

Tamil films remade in other languages
2001 films
Indian drama films
Films directed by K. S. Ravikumar
2000s Tamil-language films
2001 drama films
Super Good Films films